The Short-course Off-road Drivers Association (usually abbreviated as SODA) was a short course off-road racing sanctioning body in the United States.

History
SODA began as a Midwestern United States off-road racing series in the early 1970s.  Most races were held in Wisconsin but a few were held in Michigan. The crown jewel of the series was the off-road championship event held at the Crandon International Off-Road Raceway - the "home of the world championship off-road race".

The vehicles used were primarily Trophy trucks, buggies (which were based on the original Volkswagen Beetle called Baja Bug), pickup trucks, and a few stock cars. All vehicles had heavily modified suspension.

Most drivers from SODA moved to CORR (Championship Off-Road Racing) after the 1997 season, which basically ended SODA's existence. A greatly diminished series continued on for at least a few years afterwards.

Classes
Class 1-1600, 1600 cc engine buggies with driver only
Class 2-1600, 1600 cc engine buggies with driver plus co-pilot (Sometimes run with class 1-1600)
Class 3, 4-wheel-drive Short Wheelbase vehicles (Jeep CJ, Ford Bronco, etc.)
Class 4, 4-wheel-drive full-size trucks
Class 5-1600, buggies with driver only
Class 6 Modified passenger cars, and later 2wd SUV's
Class 7s, 2-wheel-drive four-cylinder trucks
Class 8, 2-wheel-drive full-size trucks
Class 8s 2-wheel-drive full-size trucks (nearly stock vehicles, with restrictor plate V8 engines)
Class 9, Modified Buggies with up to 1914 cc Air-cooled engines, or 1600 cc engines water-cooled
Class 10, Class 9 with co-pilot
Class 11, Stock 1600 cc engine buggies with driver only
Class 12, Stock 1600 cc engine buggies with driver plus co-pilot (Sometimes run with Class 11)
Class 13, 2-wheel-drive full-sized trucks with more restrictions than Class 8
Heavy Metal, combined race with Class 3, Class 4 and Class 8 trucks
SODA Light A small single-seat short-wheelbase buggy with a small CC snowmobile engine

Television
The series was televised in starting with Crandon's race in 1989 on ESPN. Series races appeared tape delayed on ESPN/ESPN2 (often during the winter months). ESPN covered the two trophy truck classes (4 and 8) along with 7S. ESPN2 started covering races in 1995. It covered Classes 13, 9/10, and 1600. The ESPN2 races featured Marty Reid as the lead announcer, Ivan Stewart as color commentator, and Jimmie Johnson as pit reporter. In late 1996, SODA sanctioned the Chevrolet Off-Road Winter Series; drivers traveled across the country in the Glen Helen Raceway in California.

Video game
In 1997, Sierra Entertainment released a SODA-themed racing video game called SODA Off-Road Racing.

Tracks that held races
Many Wisconsin and Michigan tracks held races, including:

Bark River Off-road Raceway, Bark River, Michigan
Crandon International Off-Road Raceway, Crandon, Wisconsin
Ionia Fairgrounds Speedway, Ionia, Michigan
I-96 Speedway, Lake Odessa, Michigan
Langlade County Speedway, Antigo, Wisconsin
Lake Geneva Raceway, Lake Geneva, Wisconsin
Luxemburg Speedway, Luxemburg, Wisconsin
Milan Dragway, Milan, Michigan
RedBud MX, Buchanan, Michigan
Road America, Elkhart Lake, Wisconsin
Sunnyview Expo Center, Oshkosh, Wisconsin
Memorial Total Off-Road Rally, Dresser, Wisconsin

Drivers
Scott Douglas
Evan Evans, 1996 Class 13 Champion
Walker Evans - 1994 and 1995 Class 4 champion
Jack Flannery, 7-time series champion
Brendan Gaughan - 1995 Class 13 champion, 1996 Class 8 champion
Johnny Greaves
Chad Hord
Jimmie Johnson
Jeff Kincaid
Curt LeDuc
Rob MacCachren, 1995 Class 4 champion
Scott Taylor

References

External links
1997 Crandon Spring results

Auto racing organizations in the United States
Off-road racing
Off-road racing series